Gwasg Carreg Gwalch is a publishing company based in Llanrwst, Wales.  They specialise in publishing works in the Welsh language, but also publish English-language books of Welsh interest.

The company was founded by Myrddin ap Dafydd in 1980, and was originally based in Capel Garmon.  It takes its name from Carreg-y-gwalch ("falcon rock"), a local landmark which also gives it its logo.

Gwasg Carreg Gwalch has published works by writers such as Mererid Hopwood, Meic Stephens, Mike Jenkins and T. Llew Jones.

References

Publishing companies established in 1980
Publishing companies of Wales
British companies established in 1980
1980 establishments in Wales
Bro Garmon
Llanrwst